Hugh Edward "Yug" Bolton (April 15, 1929 in Toronto, Ontario — October 17, 1999 in Etobicoke, Ontario) was a Canadian ice hockey player. A defenceman, he played in the National Hockey League for the Toronto Maple Leafs between 1949 and 1956. With Toronto he won the Stanley Cup in 1951.

Career statistics

Regular season and playoffs

Awards and achievements
 1950 Allan Cup Championship  (Toronto)
 1951 Stanley Cup  Championship  (Toronto
 1956  NHL All Star  (Toronto)

External links

Picture of Hugh Bolton's Name on the 1951 Stanley Cup Plaque

1929 births
1999 deaths
Canadian ice hockey defencemen
Canadian people of English descent
Ontario Hockey Association Senior A League (1890–1979) players
Pittsburgh Hornets players
Queen's University at Kingston alumni
Rochester Americans players
Ice hockey people from Toronto
Stanley Cup champions
Toronto Maple Leafs players
Toronto Marlboros players
Toronto Young Rangers players